Vera Klavdievna Zvjaginceva or Zvyagintseva (1894-1972) was a Russian actress, poet, translator and memoirist. She translated poetry from Armenian to Russian including the poetry of Gevorg Emin, and that of Rachiya Ovanesyan.

Life

Zvyagintseva was friends with many artists and writers, including Marina Tsvetaeva, Sophia Parnok, and Boris Pasternak. She met Tsvetaeva in Moscow in summer 1919.

In summer 1933 Zvyagintseva was ill with acute colitis and dysentery. Sophia Parnok, herself in the last year of her life, wrote to her lover about Zvyagintseva:

Works
 Na mostu: stikhotvorenii︠a︡. Moscow, 1922.
 Poėzii︠a︡ sovetskoĭ Armenii : sbornik. Moscow: Gos. izd-vo khudozh. lit-ry, 1947.
 Narty: kabardinskiĭ epos.  Moscow, 1957.
 Ispovedʹ. Stikhi. Moscow: Sovetskiĭ Pisatelʹ, 1967.
 Izbrannye stikhi. Moscow, 1968.

References

1894 births
1972 deaths
Russian poets
Russian women poets
20th-century Russian translators
Translators to Russian
Translators from Armenian
20th-century Russian women